Following is a list of the county executives of Jackson County, Missouri.

Presiding Judge
From 1827 until 1972 Jackson County was headed by a three- member County Commission called a County Court, with a Presiding Judge as the county's chief executive.  There was no requirement that a judge be a lawyer, and these "judges" had no judicial authority.  The Court reflected the county's divided nature with one judge representing the then-rural eastern areas around the county seat of Independence, while the western judge represented the more urban areas closer to Kansas City.  The presiding judge was elected countywide.  Courthouses were built in both cities.  The most famous presiding judge was Harry S. Truman (later the  33rd U.S. President) who represented the Eastern District before later winning election as presiding judge. The last presiding judge, George W. Lehr, later served as Missouri State Auditor from 1974 until 1977.

1827 - Richard Fristoe
1834 - Moses G. Wilson
1838 - John Davis (county executive)
1842 - James B. Yager
1846 - Alvin Brooking
1850 - Richard D. Stanley
1862 - Jacob Leader
1865 - M. T. Graham
1866 - Andrew G. Newgent
1867 - G. W. Gates
1869 - James B. Yager
1875 - Albert Gallatin Williams
1877 - Josiah Collins
1879 - James B. Yager
1883 - Robert L. Adkins
1887 - John A. McDonald
1891 - Daniel Murphy
1895 - John B. Stone
1899 - G.L. Chrisman
1907 - J. M. Patterson
1911 - H. C. Gilbert
1915 - Miles Bulger
1923 - Elihu W. Hayes
1927 - Harry S. Truman
1935 - Eugene I. Purcell
1937 - David E. Long
1941 - George S. Montgomery
1947 - Harry M. Gambrel
1951 - Harry M. Fleming
1955 - Ray G. Cowan
1959 - John J. Kopp
1963 - Charles E. Curry
1971 - George W. Lehr

County Executive
In 1970 a new county charter was approved effective January 1973 replaced the County Court with a stronger County Commission, with representatives elected from 11 districts.  The 11 districts were reduced to 6 in 1987.  A County Executive served as presiding officer.

1973 - George W. Lehr
1975 - Mike White
1979 - Dale Baumgardner
1983 - William F. Waris
1991 - Marsha Murphy
1995 - Katheryn Shields
2007 - Mike Sanders
2016 - Fred Arbanas (Temporary)*
2016 - Frank White

References

External links
Jackson County Executive